In baseball, a grand slam is a home run hit with all three bases occupied by baserunners ("bases loaded"), thereby scoring four runs—the most possible in one play. According to The Dickson Baseball Dictionary, the term originated in the card game of contract bridge, in which a grand slam involves taking all the possible tricks. The word slam, by itself, usually is connected with a loud sound, particularly of a door being closed with excess force; thus, slamming the door on one's opponent(s), in addition to the bat slamming the ball into a home run.

Notable highlights

Players
Roger Connor is believed to have been the first major league player to hit a grand slam, on September 10, 1881, for the Troy Trojans at Riverfront Park in Rensselaer, New York.  Although Charlie Gould hit one for the Boston Red Stockings of the National Association (NA) in 1871, the NA is not recognized by Major League Baseball (MLB) as a major league.

Alex Rodriguez has 25 career grand slams, the most by any player in MLB history. Don Mattingly and Travis Hafner share the single-season record with six grand slams each – in Mattingly's case, these were the only grand slams of his major league career. Ernie Banks and Albert Pujols share the single-season National League record with five grand slams each. 

In 1968, Jim Northrup of the Detroit Tigers set a major league record by hitting three grand slams in a week, including two in consecutive at-bats of a game. This feat (three grand slams in one week) would later be matched by Larry Parrish of the Texas Rangers in 1982. However, Northrup hit his three slams in only 14 plate appearances, setting a record that still stands 

Several grand slams, the first being Connor's in 1881, consisted of a player hitting a walk-off grand slam for a one-run victory; some baseball observers call this an "ultimate grand slam".    Roberto Clemente is the only player to have hit a walk-off inside-the-park grand slam in a one-run victory; when the Pittsburgh Pirates defeated the Chicago Cubs 9–8 on July 25, 1956 at Forbes Field, a park known for its spacious outfield. The most recent ultimate grand slam was hit on September 20, 2022 by Giancarlo Stanton in the New York Yankees' 9-8 win over the Pittsburgh Pirates.

Four players hit a grand slam in their first Major League at-bat: Bill Duggleby, Jeremy Hermida, Kevin Kouzmanoff, and Daniel Nava. Kouzmanoff, Nava, and Duggleby hit theirs on the first pitch; Hermida's grand slam was in a pinch-hit at bat. 

Tony Cloninger is the only pitcher to hit two grand slams in one game, for the Atlanta Braves in a  contest against the San Francisco Giants.

Tatis was only the second National League player to hit two grand slams in one game, joining Cloninger. Therefore, Park was the first to give up both to the same batter. Tatis had never hit a grand slam before in his career.

In Japan's professional league, the feat of multiple grand slams in a single inning by a team has been accomplished three times; most recently on April 1, 2007 by José Fernández and Takeshi Yamasaki of the Tohoku Rakuten Golden Eagles.

Team
In , the Chicago White Sox hit grand slams in three consecutive games against the Houston Astros (June 23–25). Scott Podsednik hit the only grand slam of his career in the series opener. Joe Crede followed up with a slam of his own on Saturday, and Tadahito Iguchi hit a game tying grand slam in the bottom of the ninth with two outs in the series finale. On the other hand, the  Kansas City Royals surrendered grand slams in three straight games; two against the Baltimore Orioles (April 13–14) and one against the Tigers (April 16).

On August 25, the New York Yankees became the first team in MLB history to hit three grand slams in one game. Robinson Canó, Russell Martin and Curtis Granderson took Oakland Athletics pitchers Rich Harden, Fautino de los Santos, and Bruce Billings deep, with each grand slam being hit in a different inning. The Yankees would win the game 22–9.

On June 3, a record-breaking seven grand slams were hit on one day: One each for the Los Angeles Dodgers, Milwaukee Brewers, Atlanta Braves, Colorado Rockies, Chicago Cubs, Seattle Mariners, and the Los Angeles Angels of Anaheim whose Albert Pujols hit his 600th career home run.

On August 20, the San Diego Padres became the first team to hit a grand slam in four consecutive games when Fernando Tatis Jr, Wil Myers, Manny Machado, and Eric Hosmer each hit a grand slam in a series against the Texas Rangers.

On October 16, in Game 2 of the 2021 ALCS against the Houston Astros, the Boston Red Sox became the first team to hit two grand slams in one postseason game when J. D. Martinez hit one in the first inning and Rafael Devers hit one in the second. Two days later, in Game 3 of the series, Kyle Schwarber hit another slam for Boston to make the Red Sox the first team to hit three grand slams in one postseason series.

Notable calls
"Get out the rye bread and the mustard, Grandma, it is grand salami time!"- used by longtime Seattle Mariners lead commentator Dave Niehaus from the 1995 season until his death in November 2010. Currently used by Niehaus' longtime partner Rick Rizzs.

Various newspaper accounts show players used the term "grand salami" for a grand slam at least as early as 1966. "When Ernie Banks hits a grand slam he always calls it a 'grand salami,'" reported Jack Lang. "'In that way I always manage to get a nice big salami delivered to my home by the Hebrew National salami people,' Banks laughed."

Career grand slam leaders

Single-season grand slam leaders

World Series

Other MLB postseason grand slams

MLB All-Star Game grand slams

See also
Grand Slam Single
List of Major League Baseball single-game grand slam leaders

References
Ryczek, William J. (1992). Blackguards and Red Stockings; A History of Baseball's National Association 1871–1875. Wallingford, Connecticut: Colebrook Press. 
Orem, Preston D. (1961). Baseball (1845–1881) From the Newspaper Accounts. Altadena, California: Self-published.

Works cited

Batting (baseball)
Baseball terminology